Tex Morton (born Robert William Lane in Nelson, New Zealand, also credited as Robert Tex Morton; 30 August 1916 – 23 July 1983) was a pioneer of New Zealand and Australian country and western music, vaudevillian, actor, television host and circus performer.

Early life
Morton was born the eldest of four to Bernard William Lane, a postal clerk and Mildred Eastgate and attended Nelson College between 1930 and 1931. At age 15 he left home to launch himself into show business. His first attempts to run away and join the circus ended in him being found busking by police and he was promptly returned home.

Career

1930s – 1940s
About 1934, he recorded some "hillbilly songs" privately. He later claimed that these were played on New Zealand radio, though this is perhaps unlikely. Some of these recordings have recently come to light, though they have not been commercially reissued. About 1934 (the exact date is uncertain - Morton himself also claimed it was 1932), he emigrated to Australia, apparently intent on a recording career. On 25 February 1936, he recorded four songs for the Columbia Graphophone Company in Sydney, Australia.

Between 1936 and 1943, Morton recorded 93 songs, accompanying himself on an acoustic guitar for most tracks, for Columbia's Regal Zonophone label. On some later tracks, he was accompanied by his band, The Rough Riders, and a female singer 'Sister Dorrie' (Dorothy Carroll). In 1943, he left Columbia following a dispute with Arch Kerr, the Record Sales Manager, probably over the company's reluctance to use The Rough Riders. He was billed as 'The Yodelling Boundary Rider' on records, though he apparently did not approve of the name. In 1940 he recorded musical settings of 'The Stockman's Last Bed' (Regal Zonophone G24031) and 'Rover No More' originally written by Australian composer Louis Lavater.

During the 1930s and 1940s, he gradually incorporated Australian themes and motifs into some of the songs he wrote. This approach was followed by other Australian country artists who followed in his footsteps, such as Buddy Williams and Slim Dusty, leading to a particular genre of country music - the Australian bush ballad, which was also influenced by the turn-of-the-century poetry of Banjo Paterson and Henry Lawson.

In the 1940s, Morton ran a 'Dude Ranch' and guest house on a rural property in Agnes Banks on the Castlereagh Floodplain.

1950s
In 1949 and 1950, he recorded more sides in Sydney and possibly New Zealand. These were released on the Rodeo and Tasman labels; some songs were probably recorded at the instigation of US record producer Ralph Peer, who visited Sydney in 1949 and met Morton.

From 1950 to 1959, Morton was in Canada and the United States. He toured with Pee Wee King in 1952 and recorded in Nashville in March 1953. Morton toured Canada and the United States as a stage hypnotist, memory expert, whip cracker and sharpshooter, and was associated for some time with the Canadian country singer, Dixie Bill Hilton.  He claimed to have toured for six months as an opening act for Hank Williams, but this is extremely unlikely, though he may have met Williams in late 1952 through Oscar Davis, who was Morton's manager and Williams's last manager, or he might have been part of Hilton's opening act for Williams in one of Williams' concerts in Canada.

He returned to Australia in 1959 with a Grand Ole Opry show, featuring Roy Acuff, the Wilburn Brothers and June Webb, but the show was not popular with Australian audiences and the tour had to be called off.

In one of his acts, he asked the audience to give him 100 words. He would recount them back in order, "forgetting" one of them around the 50th word only to suddenly remember the word when he had almost finished his act.

1960s – 1970s
Morton continued to record during the 1960s and 1970s, and had a surprise hit with "Goondiwindi Grey" on the Australian Singles Charts, reaching No. 5 in June 1973. The fiddle accompaniment on the track was provided by long-time friend and veteran of the Sydney entertainment scene comedian/violinist George Raymond.

During this period, Morton showed an increasing interest in acting. He appeared in Australian television shows and feature movies (such as We of the Never Never).

He was the first inductee into Australian Roll of Renown in 1976, recognising his pivotal role in the development of country music in Australia and New Zealand.

Style
Morton, in his career, capitalized on American cowboy and "Wild West" images, and was sometimes billed as "The Singing Cowboy Sensation," performing for rodeos, and singing in a yodeling style that drew heavily on those of American singers such as Jimmie Rodgers. His yodelling was influenced by Rodgers, Goebel Reeves and the British Alpine yodeller, Harry Torrani. Although Morton chose to sing in an American (rather than a New Zealand or Australian) accent and sang many songs with American subject matter, several of his recorded songs (such as "The Ned Kelly Song," "Beautiful Queensland," and "Murrumbidgee Jack") feature Australian themes. ("Beautiful Queensland" was a re-write of W. Lee O'Daniel's "Beautiful Texas").

Awards and nominations

Country Music Awards of Australia
The Country Music Awards of Australia (CMAA) (also known as the Golden Guitar Awards) is an annual awards night held in January during the Tamworth Country Music Festival, celebrating recording excellence in the Australian country music industry. They have been held annually since 1973.
 (wins only)
! 
|-
| 1974
| "Goondiwindi Grey"
| APRA song of the Year
| 
| 
|-
| 1976
| Tex Morton
| Australian Roll of Renown
| 
|

Film and TV roles

Personal
He lived his later years in Manly, and was a dedicated and well-known amateur radio (ham radio) user with contacts all over the world - including the US Navy. His broadcast handle (callsign) was VK2AHZ and Tex was a member of the Manly-Warringah Radio Society.

Morton died in Sydney's Royal North Shore Hospital on 23 July 1983, after a short battle with lung cancer. His long-time partner, Kath, was by his side.

There is a collection of bronze busts in Bicentennial Park, Tamworth that includes Shirley Thoms, Stan Coster, Tex Morton, Gordon Parsons, Barry Thornton and Buddy Williams.

References

External links

AudioCulture profile
"Tex Morton:  Boundary Rider," from The New Zealand Edge
1951 Tex Morton: Hypnotizing Yellowknife NWT Historical Timeline, Prince of Wales Northern heritage Centre
 Listen to an excerpt of 'Wrap Me Up With My Stockwhip and Blanket' on australianscreen online
 'Wrap Me Up with My Stockwhip and Blanket' was added to the National Film and Sound Archive's Sounds of Australia registry in 2010

1916 births
1983 deaths
New Zealand buskers
New Zealand country singers
People from Nelson, New Zealand
People educated at Nelson College
20th-century New Zealand  male singers